Fernando González (born June 12, 1989 in Tampa, Florida) is a Puerto Rican footballer.

Career

College and Amateur
González played for Tampa powerhouse HC United. With HCU, he won the SYL North American championship. He also played at Gaither High School during his time with HC United. González then played in college for the USF Bulls.

Professional
González signed with Atlanta Silverbacks of the second tier North American Soccer League and made his professional debut on April 9, 2011 in a game against NSC Minnesota Stars. Atlanta announced on November 8, 2011 that González would return for the 2012 season.

International
In 2008, he played 3 games for Puerto Rico in the FIFA U20 World Cup Qualifiers in Cayman Islands, starting all 3 of them. González trained with the Puerto Rico U-21's ahead of the 2010 Central American and Caribbean Games.  In October 2010, he was called up by the Puerto Rico Men's National Team to play in the Digicel Caribbean Cup but he was not released by the University of South Florida to do so.

References

External links

USF Bulls profile

1989 births
Living people
American soccer players
Puerto Rican footballers
Puerto Rico international footballers
South Florida Bulls men's soccer players
Atlanta Silverbacks players
North American Soccer League players
Gaither High School alumni
Soccer players from Tampa, Florida
Association football midfielders